Christopher Michael Marvin (born April 2, 1979) is a former United States Army helicopter pilot. He is the founder and former executive director of Got Your 6, a campaign that works with studios, networks and agencies in the entertainment industry, to shift perceptions of veterans and military families. He is now the principal at Marvin Strategies, a consulting practice focused on veteran-related strategy and communication.

Early life and education

Marvin was born and raised in Central Illinois.  He holds a Bachelor of Business Administration from the University of Notre Dame and Masters in Business Administration from the Wharton School of the University of Pennsylvania.

Military service 

Marvin served more than seven years as a US Army Officer and Black Hawk helicopter pilot,  leading an aviation platoon in Afghanistan.
He was named the Distinguished Honor Graduate of his Aviation Officer Basic Course and was assigned to the 25th Infantry Division.

In Afghanistan, he flew 40 combat missions before being severely wounded in a helicopter crash near the Afghan-Pakistan border, which ended his military career.
As a result of the crash, crew chief Sgt. Daniel Galvin was killed.  Marvin spent four years recovering from his wounds, and during that time he began volunteering as an advocate for other wounded veterans.

Volunteer Service 

Marvin was named the first Mission Continues fellow in 2007 and developed the organization's original slogan “It's not a charity, it's a challenge.” As the national director of the Fellowship Program, he logged more than 2,000 volunteer hours in 2008 for The Mission Continues before joining the organization as full-time staff in 2009.

He has also been  the director of civilian-military partnerships for ServiceNation where he headed the Mission Serve initiative. and oversaw   service projects in 11 major American cities on 11/11/11, in honor of  Veterans Day.

Marvin served as a commissioner for the Bipartisan Policy Center's Commission on Political Reform. He is a Truman National Security Fellow and a Presidio Institute Cross Sector Leadership Fellow.

Got Your 6 

Chris Marvin is the founder and former executive director of the national veteran campaign Got Your 6.
The organization was founded in 2012 as a coalition of entertainment industry companies, and nonprofit organizations focused on veterans and military families,.

In 2015, Marvin departed Got Your 6 to launch a consulting practice focused on veteran-related strategy and communication.

Awards and honors

Chris Marvin's military awards include the Bronze Star, Meritorious Service Medal, and the Air Medal.
His work with Got Your 6 has been recognized  with awards from the National Conference on Citizenship,  Points of Light, Goodwill Industries, and the Clinton Global Initiative.

References 

1979 births
Living people
People from Normal, Illinois
University of Notre Dame alumni
United States Army officers
United States Army aviators
United States Army personnel of the War in Afghanistan (2001–2021)
Recipients of the Air Medal
Wharton School of the University of Pennsylvania alumni
Military personnel from Illinois